The Big Story is a 1994 British animated film by Tim Watts and David Stoten from Spitting Image Productions and starring Frank Gorshin (previously known as The Riddler on the 1960s TV version of Batman.)

Summary
A witty spoof on the films Kirk Douglas from various ages, a young 1950s reporter is looking for his big chance pleading his editor for a breaking story.

Production
The film was animated twice-once hand-drawn and then again in stop-motion.

Quentin Tarantino requested this short to play before screening Pulp Fiction.

Availability
Released on the now out-of-print Short 1-Invention DVD

Accolades
1995: BAFTA Award for Best Short Animation (won)
1995: Academy Award for Best Animated Short Film (nominated)

See also
Ace in the Hole, the 1951 film about an ambitious reporter looking for a big story
 Postmodernist film
 Film noir

References

External links
Pencil test version on YouTube
Final film also on YouTube

1994 films
1994 animated films
1990s stop-motion animated films
British parody films
British animated short films
1990s animated short films
1990s satirical films
BAFTA winners (films)
Films about journalists
Spitting Image
Cultural depictions of actors
1990s parody films
1994 comedy films
1990s British films
Films set in the 1950s